Decyl glucoside is a mild non-ionic surfactant used in cosmetic formularies, including baby shampoo and in products for individuals with a sensitive skin.  Many natural personal care companies use this cleanser because it is plant-derived, biodegradable, and gentle for all hair types.

Decyl glucoside was invented by Robert Prairie in 1934.

Synthesis
Decyl glucoside is produced by the reaction of glucose from corn starch with the fatty alcohol decanol, which is derived from coconut.

See also
 Lauryl glucoside
 Octyl glucoside

References

Cleaning product components
Non-ionic surfactants
Glucosides